The Stiletto Formal was a self-proclaimed "eccentric rock and roll" band from Phoenix, Arizona, and were one of the few rock bands featuring a cello and other exotic instruments and effects as an integral part of their sound. In addition to these qualities and unusual time signatures, Kyle Howard's falsetto provided distinction in their music. Their lyrics are often constructed into a short story format. They had gained a local fanbase in Arizona and were attracting national attention after playing nationwide tours and appearing on the Vans Warped Tour; however, band frontman Kyle Howard relocated to Los Angeles in 2009, and the group's Facebook and Myspace profiles have since been devoid of group activity.

In addition to their two released EP's, Masochism in the Place of Romance and This Is My Boomstick, the band has four unreleased songs, "The Everlasting Gaze" originally performed by Smashing Pumpkins two demos called "This Song Can't Be About Blowing Things Up Because Of Terrorism". and "Moonshine" as well as a song entitled "Botox in Bulk" which was never recorded.

Their debut album is entitled ¡Fiesta Fiesta Fiesta Fiesta!, which is self-described as being "dark but still upbeat" with sound engineer Nigel Godrich (Radiohead) as sound engineer. It was released on October 21, 2008. They worked with producers Cory Spotts (Job For A Cowboy, Greeley Estates) and Darrell Thorp (Radiohead, Outkast, Beck) for the album, which was released on Eyeball Records.

Final Lineup
Kyle Howard - Vocals, Percussion, Keyboard
Paul Neely - Bass, Percussion, Keyboard
Sunny Davis - Cello, Shaker
Jimi Lamp - Guitar
Pat McCarthy - Drums

Former members
Nole Kennedy - Drums
Drew Domm - Drums
Shelly Barnes - Keyboard, Vocals, Percussion
Brady Leffler - Keyboard

Discography
Masochism in the Place of Romance EP (2005)
This Is My Boomstick EP (2006)
¡Fiesta Fiesta Fiesta Fiesta! (October 21, 2008)

Gear Used
Kyle Howard - Korg Keyboard, Foot processor, Maracas, Cowbell, Timpanes, others
Paul Neely - MicroKorg, Roland SP-404, BOSS Bass Overdrive, Electro-Harmonix Big Muff Pi, Sans-Amp, others
Sunny Davis - Zeta  Strados Fusion Electric Cello, Boss Digital Delay, Either a Danelectro Chorus or Octave Pedal, others
Jimi Lamp - '72 Fender Telecaster, Electro-Harmonix Big Muff Pi, Boss Digital Delay, ErnieBall Volume Pedal, Ibanez Tube Screamer, others

References

American post-hardcore musical groups
Musical groups from Phoenix, Arizona
2004 establishments in Arizona
2009 disestablishments in Arizona
Musical groups established in 2004
Musical groups disestablished in 2009
Rock music groups from Arizona